Wendy James (born in Sydney, 1966) is an Australian author of crime and literary fiction.  James received a Bachelor of Arts from the University of Sydney an MA (writing) from University of Technology, Sydney and a PhD from the University of New England, Armidale.

James is the eldest sister of Young Adult author Rebecca James.
She lives in Newcastle, New South Wales.

Awards 
Ned Kelly Awards for Crime Writing, Best first crime novel, 2006: Out of the Silence : A Story of Love, Betrayal, Politics and Murder
Dobbie Encouragement Award, 2006: shortlisted for Out of the Silence : A Story of Love, Betrayal, Politics and Murder
Ned Kelly Awards for Crime Writing, Best Novel, 2017: shortlisted for The Golden Child

Bibliography

Novels 
 Out of the Silence : A Story of Love, Betrayal, Politics and Murder (2005)
 The Steele Diaries (Vintage, 2008; Momentum, 2013)
Where Have You Been? (UWAP, 2010)
The Mistake (Penguin, 2012)
 The Lost Girls (Penguin, 2014)
 The Golden Child (HarperCollins, 2017)
 The Accusation (HarperCollins, 2019)
 A Little Bird (Lake Union, 2021)

Short stories 
''Why She Loves Him'' (UWAP, 2009)

References

External links
 Author's website
 Author profile at Penguin Books Australia

21st-century Australian novelists
Australian crime writers
Australian women short story writers
Australian women novelists
1966 births
Living people
Ned Kelly Award winners
21st-century Australian women writers
Women crime writers
21st-century Australian short story writers